Erich Claunigk (1900-1976) was a German cinematographer. He was active during the Nazi era and postwar years in West Germany and frequently worked on comedy films.

Selected filmography

 Hilde and the Volkswagen (1936)
 Ball at the Metropol (1937)
 The Scoundrel (1939)
 Three Wonderful Days (1939)
 Anuschka (1942)
 A Man Like Maximilian (1945)
 Good Fortune in Ohio (1950)
 The Disturbed Wedding Night (1950)
 Theodore the Goalkeeper (1950)
 My Friend the Thief (1951)
 Once on the Rhine (1952)
 Fanfare of Marriage (1953)
 The Bachelor Trap (1953)
 Salto Mortale (1953)
 Street Serenade (1953)
 Columbus Discovers Kraehwinkel (1954)
 The Double Husband (1955)
 Three Girls from the Rhine (1955)
 My Children and I (1955)
 Lemke's Widow (1957)
 Two Bavarians in the Harem (1957)
 Doctor Bertram (1957)
 The Crammer (1958)
 Hula-Hopp, Conny (1959)
 Roses for the Prosecutor (1959)
 Triplets on Board (1959)
 The Black Sheep (1960)
 The Juvenile Judge (1960)
 Conny and Peter Make Music (1960)
He Can't Stop Doing It (1962)
 My Daughter and I (1963)
 A Mission for Mr. Dodd (1964)

References

Bibliography 
 Giesen, Rolf. Nazi Propaganda Films: A History and Filmography. McFarland, 2003.
 Nicolella, Henry. Frank Wisbar: The Director of Ferryman Maria, from Germany to America and Back. McFarland, 2018.

External links 
 

1900 births
1976 deaths
Film people from Berlin
German cinematographers

de:Erich Claunigk